Le Quatuor ('the Quartet' in French) are a group of French musicians and stage actors known for their musical comedy acts.

The quartet has existed for around 30 years (as of 2011), and is composed of Jean-Claude Camors (violin), Laurent Vercambre (violin), Pierre Ganem (viola), and Jean-Yves Lacombe (cello). Their most recent stage show as of 2011 is 'Corps à Cordes'.

References 

French musical groups
French comedians
Musical groups established in 1980